Argenteuil is a regional county municipality located in the Laurentides region of Quebec, Canada. Its seat is Lachute.

History
This fiefdom was bounded by the Ottawa River to the south, a line through the center of the hamlet of Carillon in the west and Clear Lake (Lac Clair) to the north. Since Ailleboust already owned a house in Argenteuil near Paris, he called his domain Argenteuil Seigneury. In 1697, the Lord of Ailleboust and his wife Catherine Le Gardeur sold their seigneury to their son Pierre d'Ailleboust d'Argenteuil. Subsequently over the years, the fiefdom was held by Pierre-Louis Panet, and then by Major Murray.

After the conquest of New France by the British in 1759 during the Seven Years' War, the British implemented their laws, but maintained certain French seigneurial rights. In 1796, Jedediah Lane, from Jericho, Vermont, bought from Major Murray several thousand acres of land on both sides of the North River (Rivière du Nord), where Lachute is today. In 1809, Thomas Barron bought the land of the territory that would become the center of the town of Lachute.  Five years later, Sir John Johnson, a Loyalist from New York who had resettled in Canada after the American Revolution, bought the rest of the Argenteuil Seigneury. He built a sawmill and gave land for churches, helping to attract new settlers to Argenteuil.

In 1854, the Parliament of the Province of Canada abolished the seigneurial system, and the County of Argenteuil was created the following year. In January 1983, the Argenteuil Regional County Municipality succeeded the County of Argenteuil.

Subdivisions
There are 9 subdivisions within the RCM:

Cities (2)
Lachute
Brownsburg-Chatham

Municipalities (3)
Grenville-sur-la-Rouge
Mille-Isles
Saint-André-d'Argenteuil

Townships (3)
Gore
Harrington
Wentworth

Villages (1)
Grenville

Demographics

Population

Language

Transportation

Access Routes
Highways and numbered routes that run through the municipality, including external routes that start or finish at the county border:

 Autoroutes
 

 Principal Highways
 
 

 Secondary Highways
 
 
 

 External Routes
 None

Attractions
 Argenteuil Regional Museum (Saint-André-d'Argenteuil)
 Carillon Canal
 Caserne-de-Carillon National Historic site (Carillon Barracks)
 Lachute Airport (Lachute)

See also
 List of regional county municipalities and equivalent territories in Quebec

References

External links 
Official Web site of MRC of Argenteuil
  Official Web site of the Count of Argenteuil (History of Seigniors of Argenteuil)

Regional county municipalities in Laurentides
Census divisions of Quebec
Lachute